David Morton Baynham (12 June 1902 – 1974) was a Welsh professional footballer who played in the Football League for Aberdare Athletic and Bournemouth & Boscombe Athletic as a full back.

References 

English Football League players
Association football fullbacks
Scunthorpe United F.C. players
Midland Football League players
Welsh footballers
1902 births
1974 deaths
Southern Football League players
Aberdare Athletic F.C. players
AFC Bournemouth players
Yeovil Town F.C. players
People from Troed-y-rhiw
Sportspeople from Merthyr Tydfil County Borough